Nucleoside diphosphate kinase 3 is an enzyme that in humans is encoded by the NME3 gene.

Interactions 

NME3 has been shown to interact with NME1 and NME2.

Clinical significance 

Mutations in this gene have been associated with congenital hypotonia, hypoventilation and cerebellar histopathological alterations.

References

Further reading

External links